I Just Wasn't Made for These Times is the second album by American musician Brian Wilson and the soundtrack to Don Was' documentary of the same name, released by MCA Records on August 15, 1995. It consists almost entirely of rerecordings of Wilson's past songs. The title is derived from the Beach Boys' 1966 song "I Just Wasn't Made for These Times".

Wilson commented of the rerecordings in a 1995 interview: “At first, I thought ‘This is gonna be contrived, the songs were all old hat. But then I understood the context of it all, so I felt free to talk without worrying about what I was saying. I got a sense of my self — a sense of worth.

Track listing

Personnel
From liner notes.

See also
 Andy Paley sessions

References

1995 albums
Brian Wilson albums
MCA Records albums
Albums produced by Brian Wilson
Albums produced by Don Was
Self-covers albums